Animal welfare organizations are concerned with the health, safety and psychological wellness of individual animals. These organizations include animal rescue groups and wildlife rehabilitation centers, which care for animals in distress and sanctuaries, where animals are brought to live and be protected for the rest of their lives. Their goals are generally distinct from conservation organizations, which are primarily concerned with the preservation of species, populations, habitats, ecosystems and biodiversity, rather than the welfare of individual animals.

For organizations with Wikipedia pages, see :Category:Animal welfare organizations.

Worldwide or serving multiple countries 

 Animal People (based in U.S.)
 Animal Transportation Association
 Animal Welfare Institute
 AnimaNaturalis
 Association of Zoos and Aquariums
 Association for Assessment and Accreditation of Laboratory Animal Care International
 Australia for Dolphins
 BirdLife International
 Brooke Hospital for Animals (equine)
 Care for the Wild International
 Compassion in World Farming
 The Donkey Sanctuary (based in U.K.)
 Friends of Animals
 Four Paws
 Global Alliance for Rabies Control
 Grey2K USA
 Humane Slaughter Association (based in UK)
 Humane Society International
 International Animal Rescue
 International Bird Rescue (based in California)
 International Fund for Animal Welfare (IFAW)
 International Primate Protection League
 Marine Connection
 Monkey World (based in U.K.)
 People for the Ethical Treatment of Animals
 Performing Animal Welfare Society
 Royal Society for the Prevention of Cruelty to Animals
 SANCCOB (seabirds, based in South Africa)
 Shark Trust
 Universities Federation for Animal Welfare (UFAW)
 Vegan Outreach
 Vets Beyond Borders
 Vets for Change
 Whale and Dolphin Conservation Society
 World Animal Protection
 World Association of Zoos and Aquariums
 World Horse Welfare

Asia 
Animals Asia Foundation
Animals Now, Israel
Todd's Welfare Society, Pakistan

Europe 
 Eurogroup for Animals
 Prince Laurent Foundation

Australia 

 Animals Australia
 Give Our Strays A Chance
 Humane Society International Australia
 Lone Pine Koala Sanctuary
 Lost Dogs' Home
 RSPCA Australia
 Voiceless, the animal protection institute

New South Wales 
 Cat Protection Society of NSW
 DoggieRescue.com
 RSPCA NSW

Victoria 
 Cat Protection Society of Victoria

Tasmania 
 RSPCA Tasmania

Austria 
 Four Paws

The Bahamas
 Bahamas Humane Society

Bolivia 

 Comunidad Inti Wara Yassi
 La Senda Verde (wildlife)
 Voluntarios en Defensa de los Animales

Canada 

 Canada's Accredited Zoos and Aquariums
 Canadian Association for Laboratory Animal Science
 Canadian Council on Animal Care (lab animals)
 Canadian Federation of Humane Societies
 Canadian Science Centre for Human and Animal Health

British Columbia 
 British Columbia Society for the Prevention of Cruelty to Animals (BC SPCA)
 Richmond Animal Protection Society
 Senior Animals In Need Today Society
 Vancouver Orphan Kitten Rescue Association

Alberta 
 Alberta SPCA
 Cochrane & Area Humane Society
 Second Chance Animal Rescue Society
 Voice for Animals Humane Society

Manitoba 
 Prairie Wildlife Rehabilitation Centre

Ontario 
 Little RES Q (Toronto, turtles)
 Ontario Society for the Prevention of Cruelty to Animals
 Prairie Wildlife Rehabilitation Centre
 Toronto Humane Society

Quebec 
 Fauna Foundation

Nova Scotia 
 Nova Scotia Society for the Prevention of Cruelty

China 
 Chinese Animal Protection Network
 Wah Yan College Cats

Hong Kong 
 Jane Goodall Institute (Hong Kong)
 Society for the Prevention of Cruelty to Animals (Hong Kong)

Denmark 
 Anima
 Inges kattehjem

Egypt 
 Society for Protection of Animal Rights in Egypt

Germany 
 Deutsche Arbeitsgemeinschaft zum Schutz der Eulen (owls)

Ghana 
 Ghana Wildlife Society

India 

 Abubshahar Wildlife Sanctuary
 Animal Welfare Board of India
 Bhartiya Gau Raksha Dal
 Bir Bara Ban Wildlife Sanctuary
 Bir Shikargah Wildlife Sanctuary
 Blue Cross of Hyderabad
 Blue Cross of India (Chennai)
 Federation of Indian Animal Protection Organization
 Indian National Kennel Club
 Khol Hi-Raitan Wildlife Sanctuary
 National Institute of Animal Welfare
 People for Animals
 PETA India

Ireland 
 DSPCA
 Irish Blue Cross

Jersey 
 Jersey Society for the Prevention of Cruelty to Animals

Kenya 
 David Sheldrick Wildlife Trust

Korea 
 Korea Animal Rights Advocates

Malaysia 
 Sarawak Society for the Prevention of Cruelty to Animals
 SPCA Selangor, Malaysia

Nepal 
 Animal Welfare Network Nepal
 Kathmandu Animal Treatment Centre

The Netherlands 
 Dutch Society for the Protection of Animals

Norway 
 Dyrebeskyttelsen Norge

New Zealand 

 Royal New Zealand Society for the Prevention of Cruelty to Animals
 SAFE, Save Animals From Exploitation

Pakistan 
 Todd's Welfare Society
 Pakistan Animal Welfare Society

Philippines 
 Philippine Tarsier Foundation in Bohol

Serbia 
 Organization for Respect and Care for Animals

Singapore 
 Singapore Society for the Prevention of Cruelty to Animals
 Animal Concerns Research and Education Society (ACRES)

South Africa 
 National Council of SPCAs (NSPCA)
 Chimp Eden

Switzerland 
 Susy Utzinger Animal Welfare Foundation

Thailand 
 Elephant Nature Park
 Elephantstay
 Wildlife Friends Foundation Thailand (WFFT)
 Thai Society for the Prevention of Cruelty to Animals
 Soi Dog Foundation in Bangkok, Phuket

Turkey 
 HAYTAP

Uganda 
 Ziwa Rhino Sanctuary

United Kingdom 

 Assisi Animal Sanctuary
 Badger Trust
 Battersea Dogs and Cats Home (London)
 Blue Cross
 Born Free Foundation
 British Divers Marine Life Rescue
 British Horse Society
 Cats Protection
 Centre for Animals and Social Justice
 Conservative Animal Welfare Foundation
 Dogs Trust
 Eurogroup for Animals
 Farm Animal Welfare Council
 Hillside Animal Sanctuary
 The Horse Trust
 Hounds for Heroes
 League Against Cruel Sports
 The Mayhew Animal Home
 National Animal Welfare Trust
 National Office of Animal Health
 National Wildlife Crime Unit
 Oxford Centre for Animal Ethics
 People's Dispensary for Sick Animals
 Redwings Horse Sanctuary
 Retired Greyhound Trust
 Royal Society for the Prevention of Cruelty to Animals (RSPCA)
 Save Me (animal welfare)
 Scottish Society for Prevention of Cruelty to Animals
 Screech Owl Sanctuary
 Swan Sanctuary, Shepperton
 Thornberry Animal Sanctuary
 Ulster Society for the Prevention of Cruelty to Animals
 Wetheriggs Zoo and Animal Sanctuary
 Viva! (organisation)

United States 

 Alley Cat Allies
 Alley Cat Rescue
 American Humane Association
 American Pet Association
 American Society for the Prevention of Cruelty to Animals
 American Tortoise Rescue
 Animal Legal Defense Fund
 Animal People
 Animal Protection and Rescue League
 Best Friends Animal Society
 Coastal Pet Rescue
 Farm Sanctuary
 Food Animal Concerns Trust
 Humane Farm Animal Care
 The Humane League
 Humane Research Council
 Humane Society of the United States
 National Animal Interest Alliance
 No Kill Advocacy Center
 Office of Laboratory Animal Welfare
 Petfinder
 Pets for Vets
 Sky Ark
 United States Association of Reptile Keepers
 Wild Animal Initiative
 The Wild Animal Sanctuary

Alabama 
 Alabama Wildlife Center

California 
 Animal Ethics
 Animal Rescue Foundation
 Dedication and Everlasting Love to Animals Rescue
 Helen Woodward Animal Center
 Hope for Paws
 House Rabbit Society
 Northcoast Marine Mammal Center

Colorado 
 Dumb Friends League
 The Wild Animal Sanctuary

Florida
Humane Society of Pinellas

Illinois 
 The Anti-Cruelty Society
 Safe Humane Chicago

Indiana 
 Black Pine Animal Sanctuary
 Friends of Indianapolis Animal Care & Control
 Humane Society of Indianapolis

Louisiana 
 Villalobos Rescue Center (New Orleans, featured on the television series Pit Bulls & Parolees)

Maryland 
 Alley Cat Rescue

Massachusetts 
 Massachusetts Society for the Prevention of Cruelty to Animals-Angell Animal Medical Center
 Winslow Farm

Michigan 
 Michigan Humane Society

New Jersey 
 Liberty Humane Society
 New Jersey Society for the Prevention of Cruelty to Animals

New York 
 Friends of Animals
 North Shore Animal League America
 Woodstock Farm Animal Sanctuary
 Sato Project

North Carolina 
 Goathouse Refuge

Oregon 
 Chimps Inc.
 Feral Cat Coalition of Oregon

Pennsylvania 
 Animal Rescue League of Western Pennsylvania
 Humane League of Lancaster County
 Red Paw Emergency Relief Team

Tennessee 
 The Elephant Sanctuary (Hohenwald)
 Tiger Haven

Texas 
 Bat World Sanctuary
 Operation Kindness

Virginia 
 Alley Cat Rescue
 Humane Farm Animal Care

Zimbabwe 
 Zimbabwe Society for the Prevention of Cruelty to Animals

See also 
 Society for the Prevention of Cruelty to Animals
 List of animal rights advocates
 List of animal rights groups

References

External links 

 

Lists
Dog welfare organizations
Domestic cat welfare organizations
Animal rights-related lists